The following is an alphabetical list of articles related to the U.S. state of Minnesota.

0–9 

.mn.us – Internet second-level domain for the state of Minnesota
32nd state to join the United States of America

A
Adjacent states and provinces:

Agriculture in Minnesota
Airports in Minnesota
American Jugoslav Association of Minnesota
Amusement parks in Minnesota
Aquaria in Minnesota
commons:Category:Aquaria in Minnesota
Arboreta in Minnesota
commons:Category:Arboreta in Minnesota
Archaeology of Minnesota
:Category:Archaeological sites in Minnesota
commons:Category:Archaeological sites in Minnesota
Architecture of Minnesota
Art museums and galleries in Minnesota
commons:Category:Art museums and galleries in Minnesota
Astronomical observatories in Minnesota
commons:Category:Astronomical observatories in Minnesota

B
Beaches of Minnesota
commons:Category:Beaches of Minnesota
Botanical gardens in Minnesota
commons:Category:Botanical gardens in Minnesota
Buildings and structures in Minnesota
commons:Category:Buildings and structures in Minnesota

C

Canyons and gorges of Minnesota
commons:Category:Canyons and gorges of Minnesota
Capital of the State of Minnesota
Capitol of the State of Minnesota
commons:Category:Minnesota State Capitol
Casinos in Minnesota
Caves of Minnesota
commons:Category:Caves of Minnesota
Cemeteries in Minnesota
Census statistical areas of Minnesota
Cities in Minnesota
commons:Category:Cities in Minnesota
Climate of Minnesota
:Category:Climate of Minnesota
commons:Category:Climate of Minnesota
Climate change in Minnesota 
Colleges and universities in Minnesota
commons:Category:Universities and colleges in Minnesota

Communications in Minnesota
commons:Category:Communications in Minnesota
Companies in Minnesota
:Category:Companies based in Minnesota
Congressional districts of Minnesota
Constitution of the State of Minnesota
Convention centers in Minnesota
commons:Category:Convention centers in Minnesota
Counties of the State of Minnesota
commons:Category:Counties in Minnesota
Courthouses in Minnesota
Culture of Minnesota
:Category:Minnesota culture
commons:Category:Minnesota culture

D
Demographics of Minnesota

E
Ecology of Minnesota
Economy of Minnesota
:Category:Economy of Minnesota
commons:Category:Economy of Minnesota
Education in Minnesota
:Category:Education in Minnesota
commons:Category:Education in Minnesota
Elections of the state of Minnesota
commons:Category:Minnesota elections
Environment of Minnesota
commons:Category:Environment of Minnesota

F

Festivals in Minnesota
commons:Category:Festivals in Minnesota
Films set in Minnesota
Films shot in Minnesota
Flag of the state of Minnesota
Flora of Minnesota
Forests in Minnesota
:Category:Minnesota state forests
Forestry in Minnesota
Forts in Minnesota
:Category:Forts in Minnesota
commons:Category:Forts in Minnesota

G

Geography of Minnesota
:Category:Geography of Minnesota
commons:Category:Geography of Minnesota
Geology of Minnesota
:Category:Geology of Minnesota
commons:Category:Geology of Minnesota
Ghost towns in Minnesota
:Category:Ghost towns in Minnesota
commons:Category:Ghost towns in Minnesota
Golf clubs and courses in Minnesota
Government of the state of Minnesota  website
:Category:Government of Minnesota
commons:Category:Government of Minnesota
Governor of the State of Minnesota
List of governors of Minnesota
Great Seal of the State of Minnesota

H
Hennepin County Law Library
Heritage railroads in Minnesota
commons:Category:Heritage railroads in Minnesota
High schools of Minnesota
Higher education in Minnesota
Highway routes in Minnesota
Hiking trails in Minnesota
commons:Category:Hiking trails in Minnesota
History of Minnesota
Historical outline of Minnesota
Hospitals in Minnesota
House of Representatives of the State of Minnesota

I
Images of Minnesota
commons:Category:Minnesota
Islands in Minnesota
Island Station Power Plant

J

K

L
Lakes in Minnesota
Lake Superior
:Category:Lakes of Minnesota
commons:Category:Lakes of Minnesota
Landmarks in Minnesota
commons:Category:Landmarks in Minnesota
Lieutenant Governor of the State of Minnesota
Lists related to the state of Minnesota:
List of airports in Minnesota
List of Minnesota amphibians
List of Minnesota ants
List of Minnesota aquatic plants
List of Minnesota birds
List of census statistical areas in Minnesota
List of cities in Minnesota
List of colleges and universities in Minnesota
List of companies in Minnesota
List of United States congressional districts in Minnesota
List of counties in Minnesota
List of dams and reservoirs in Minnesota
List of fish in Minnesota
List of forts in Minnesota
List of ghost towns in Minnesota
List of governors of Minnesota
List of high schools in Minnesota
List of highway routes in Minnesota
List of hospitals in Minnesota
List of islands in Minnesota
List of lakes in Minnesota
List of law enforcement agencies in Minnesota
List of lieutenant governors of Minnesota
List of Minnesota mammals
List of museums in Minnesota
List of National Historic Landmarks in Minnesota
List of newspapers in Minnesota
List of people from Minnesota
List of power stations in Minnesota
List of radio stations in Minnesota
List of railroads in Minnesota
List of Registered Historic Places in Minnesota
List of Minnesota reptiles
List of rivers of Minnesota
List of school districts in Minnesota
List of snakes in Minnesota
List of state forests in Minnesota
List of state parks in Minnesota
List of state prisons in Minnesota
List of symbols of the State of Minnesota
List of television stations in Minnesota
List of towns in Minnesota
List of Minnesota trees
List of United States congressional delegations from Minnesota
List of United States congressional districts in Minnesota
List of United States representatives from Minnesota
List of United States senators from Minnesota
List of Minnesota weather records
List of Minnesota wild flowers
Louisiana Purchase of 1803

M
Maps of Minnesota
commons:Category:Maps of Minnesota
Maritime Heritage Minnesota
Mass media in Minnesota
Minneapolis, Minnesota
Minnesota  website
:Category:Minnesota
commons:Category:Minnesota
Minnesota Advanced Practice Registered Nursing
Minnesota Borderline Personality Disorder Scale
Minnesota Food Cooperative Wars
Minnesota Ovarian Cancer Alliance
Minnesota Philosophical Society
Minnesota Rail Service Improvement Program
Minnesota select volleyball club
:Category:Minnesota State Capitol
:commons:Category:Minnesota State Capitol
Minnesota Technology Education Association
Minnesotans' Military Appreciation Fund
Mississippi River
Mississippi River oil spill (1962–63)
MN – United States Postal Service postal code for the state of Minnesota
Mountains of Minnesota
Mooney Site
commons:Category:Mountains of Minnesota
Museums in Minnesota
:Category:Museums in Minnesota
commons:Category:Museums in Minnesota
Music of Minnesota
commons:Category:Music of Minnesota

N
National Forests of Minnesota
commons:Category:National Forests of Minnesota
National Historic Landmarks
National Natural Landmarks in Minnesota
Natural arches of Minnesota
commons:Category:Natural arches of Minnesota
Natural disasters of Minnesota
Natural gas pipelines in Minnesota
Natural history of Minnesota
commons:Category:Natural history of Minnesota
Nature centers in Minnesota
commons:Category:Nature centers in Minnesota
News media in Minnesota
Newspapers of Minnesota

O
Outdoor sculptures in Minnesota
commons:Category:Outdoor sculptures in Minnesota

P
People from Minnesota
:Category:People from Minnesota
commons:Category:People from Minnesota
:Category:People by city in Minnesota
:Category:People by county in Minnesota
:Category:People from Minnesota by occupation
Politics of Minnesota
:Category:Politics of Minnesota
commons:Category:Politics of Minnesota
Protected areas of Minnesota
commons:Category:Protected areas of Minnesota

Q

R
Radio stations in Minnesota
Railroad museums in Minnesota
commons:Category:Railroad museums in Minnesota
Railroads in Minnesota
Red River of the North
Registered Historic Places in Minnesota
commons:Category:Registered Historic Places in Minnesota
Religion in Minnesota
:Category:Religion in Minnesota
commons:Category:Religion in Minnesota
Repopulation of wolves in Midwestern United States
Rivers of Minnesota
commons:Category:Rivers of Minnesota
Rock formations in Minnesota
commons:Category:Rock formations in Minnesota
Roller coasters in Minnesota
commons:Category:Roller coasters in Minnesota

S
Saint Paul, Minnesota, territorial and state capital since 1849
School districts of Minnesota
Scouting in Minnesota
Senate of the State of Minnesota
Settlements in Minnesota
Cities in Minnesota
Townships in Minnesota
Census Designated Places in Minnesota
Other unincorporated communities in Minnesota
List of ghost towns in Minnesota
Ski areas and resorts in Minnesota
commons:Category:Ski areas and resorts in Minnesota
Solar power in Minnesota
Sports in Minnesota
:Category:Sports in Minnesota
commons:Category:Sports in Minnesota
:Category:Sports venues in Minnesota
commons:Category:Sports venues in Minnesota
State Capitol of Minnesota
State of Minnesota  website
Constitution of the State of Minnesota
Government of the state of Minnesota
:Category:Government of Minnesota
commons:Category:Government of Minnesota
Executive branch of the government of the state of Minnesota
Governor of the State of Minnesota
Legislative branch of the government of the state of Minnesota
Legislature of the State of Minnesota
Senate of the State of Minnesota
House of Representatives of the State of Minnesota
Judicial branch of the government of the state of Minnesota
Supreme Court of the State of Minnesota
State parks of Minnesota
commons:Category:State parks of Minnesota
State prisons of Minnesota
Structures in Minnesota
commons:Category:Buildings and structures in Minnesota
Supreme Court of the State of Minnesota
Symbols of the state of Minnesota
:Category:Symbols of Minnesota
commons:Category:Symbols of Minnesota

T
Telecommunications in Minnesota
commons:Category:Communications in Minnesota
Telephone area codes in Minnesota
Television shows set in Minnesota
Television stations in Minnesota
Territory of Iowa, 1838–1846
Territory of Louisiana, 1805–1812
Territory of Michigan, 1805-(1834–1836)-1837
Territory of Minnesota, 1849–1858
Territory of Missouri, 1812–1821
Territory of Wisconsin, 1836-(1838)-1848
Theatres in Minnesota
commons:Category:Theatres in Minnesota
Tourism in Minnesota  website
commons:Category:Tourism in Minnesota
Towns in Minnesota
commons:Category:Cities in Minnesota
Transportation in Minnesota
:Category:Transportation in Minnesota
commons:Category:Transport in Minnesota

U
United States of America
States of the United States of America
United States census statistical areas of Minnesota
United States congressional delegations from Minnesota
United States congressional districts in Minnesota
Minnesota's 1st congressional district
Minnesota's 2nd congressional district
Minnesota's 3rd congressional district
Minnesota's 4th congressional district
Minnesota's 5th congressional district
Minnesota's 6th congressional district
Minnesota's 7th congressional district
Minnesota's 8th congressional district
United States Court of Appeals for the Eighth Circuit
United States District Court for the District of Minnesota
United States representatives from Minnesota
United States senators from Minnesota
Universities and colleges in Minnesota
commons:Category:Universities and colleges in Minnesota
US-MN – ISO 3166-2:US region code for the State of Minnesota

V

W
Water parks in Minnesota
Waterfalls of Minnesota
commons:Category:Waterfalls of Minnesota
Wikimedia
Wikimedia Commons:Category:Minnesota
commons:Category:Maps of Minnesota
Wikinews:Category:Minnesota
Wikinews:Portal:Minnesota
Wikipedia Category:Minnesota
Wikipedia Portal:Minnesota
Wikipedia:WikiProject Minnesota
:Category:WikiProject Minnesota articles
Wikipedia:WikiProject Minnesota#Participants
Wind power in Minnesota

X

Y

Z
Zoos in Minnesota
commons:Category:Zoos in Minnesota

See also

Topic overview:
Minnesota
Outline of Minnesota

Minnesota
 
Minnesota